Ljubav is the fourth studio album by the Serbian rock band Ekatarina Velika, released in 1987. The new band member, replacing Ivan "Raka" Ranković on drums, was Srđan "Žika" Todorović (ex Radnička kontrola, Bezobrazno zeleno, Disciplina kičme). It was their first album released for the Serbian label PGP RTB, and also the first EKV album produced by the Australian musician Theodore Yanni. The album is considered to be one of the band's best and also one of the best records released in (ex)Yugoslavia.

Track listing

Personnel

Milan Mladenović - vocals, guitar
Margita Stefanović - piano, keyboards, backing vocals
Bojan Pečar - bass
Žika Todorović - drums

Additional personnel
Theodore Yanni - guitar

Legacy
In 2015 Ljubav album cover was ranked the 9th on the list of 100 Greatest Album Covers of Yugoslav Rock published by web magazine Balkanrock.

References

External links

Ekatarina Velika albums
1987 albums
PGP-RTB albums